Aditya Gadhvi (born 3 April 1994) is a playback singer and lyricist from Gujarat, India. He has rendered film songs in several Indian languages and has many chart hits. He is involved in Gujarati film scoring and has released a number of singles. He created and released a special song for Independence Day.

His renditions of "Manzil" and "Luv Ni Love Storys", composed by Parth Bharat Thakkar, were used in the film Luv Ni Love Storys.

Early life 
Gadhvi was born in Gujarat to a Gujarati-speaking family. His father is Yogesh Gadhvi. He speaks fluent Gujarati, Hindi, and Marathi.

Career 
He was a winner of "E-Tv Lok Gayak Gujarat" a folk and Sufi singer 2 songs from the movie 'Kamasutra3D' sung by Gadhvi shortlisted for Oscar nominations in 2014. He was also the winner of Gujarat's highest T.R.P gainer show "Lok Gaayak Gujarat" at the age of 18. After winning the show "Lok Gayak Gujarat", Gadhvi performed Gujarati folk music all over Gujarat, as well as Hong Kong. Gadhvi gave his voice to represent Gujarat's tableau in the Republic Day Parade of 26 January. This parade was in the presence of United States of America's President Barack Obama and India's Prime Minister Shri Narendra Modi, as well as thousands of other guests. Performed with A .R. Rahman as backing vocalist in his live shows in Dubai, Vadodara, etc. Gadhvi has worked with A. R. Rahman on the Bollywood film 'Lekar Hum Deewana Dil'.

He is popular for hits such as 'Sharato Lagu', 'Hellaro' and 'Love Ni Bhavai' among many others. Bollywood actress Priyanka Chopra has performed dandiya on Gadhvi's song when he was performing "Dakla" song on Navratra festival.

Albums

Film Songs

Achievements & Awards 

 GIMA Award for Best Traditional Folk Single
 He has sung two songs in the movie Kamasutra3D shortlisted for Oscar in 2014.

References

External links 

 Aditya Gadhvi on Facebook
 
Aditya Gadhvi at Instagram

1994 births
Tamil playback singers
Indian male playback singers
Bollywood playback singers
Kannada playback singers
Living people
Singers from Gujarat
Filmfare Awards South winners
Gujarati people

Charan
Gadhavi (surname)